Alain Minc (born 15 April 1949) is a French businessman, political advisor and author.

Biography

Early life
Alain Minc was born on April 15, 1949 in Paris to a family of Jewish immigrants from Poland. His father, Joseph Minkowski, was a dentist and a member of the Communist Party. 
Alain Minc is a graduate of the École nationale supérieure des mines de Paris, Sciences Po and the École nationale d'administration.

Career
In 1979, he became CFO of Compagnie de Saint-Gobain. In 1981, he was selected to be one of the first Young Leaders of the French-American Foundation. In 1986, he became Vice-Chairman of CIR International and General Manager of Cerus, non-Italian affiliates of Benedetti Group. In 1991, he founded his own consultancy firm, AM Conseil. He has been the Chairman of Le Monde'''s supervisory board. He sits on the board of directors of Criteria CaixaCorp since 2007. He is also a board member of Prisa, Fnac, Direct Energie, Ingenico, and Yves Saint Laurent.

He has been an advisor to Edouard Balladur, François Pinault, Vincent Bolloré, and ex-French President Nicolas Sarkozy. He came under fire for criticizing Pope Benedict XVI's position on the French Romani repatriation in 2010.

He is a member of the Nicolas Berggruen Institute. He is also a recipient of the Legion of Honour.'Légion d'honneur: enfin une vraie parité hommes-femmes". Le Nouvel Observateur, 31-01-08

Since December 2011, he is President of the board of directors of Société des Autoroutes du Nord et de l'Est de la France (SANEF) which operates motorways in northeast France under a French government concession.

BibliographyCe monde qui vientEpître à nos nouveaux maîtres (2003)
Les Prophètes du bonheur: historie personnelle de la pensée économique (2004)
Rapport sur la France de l'an 2000
Le Nouveau Moyen-âge
Les vengeances des Nations
La Machine égalitaire
Rapport sur l´informatisation de la société
Une sorte de Diable, les vies de John M. Keynes (2006)
Le Crépuscule des petits dieux (2006)
Une histoire de France (2008)
Dix jours qui ébranleront le monde (2009)
Une histoire politique des intellectuels (2010)
L'âme des nations (2012)
Vive l Allemagne (2013)

References

1949 births
Living people
French political consultants
French people of Polish-Jewish descent
Recipients of the Legion of Honour
French male writers
Businesspeople from Paris
École nationale d'administration alumni
Sciences Po alumni
Mines Paris - PSL alumni
Young Leaders of the French-American Foundation